Guam has competed at every edition of the World Championships in Athletics since 1987, bar the 2009 event. The best placings the country has had is fifth in the men's 100 metres heats by Philam Garcia and 33rd (last) in the women's marathon by Julie Ogborn in 1987.

Performances

1987

2005

2007

2011

2013

2015

2017

References 

Guam
World Championships in Athletics